Lacerta monticola is a synonymous species name that has been applied to several taxa:

Iberolacerta monticola
Iberolacerta galani
Iberolacerta bonnali
Iberolacerta cyreni cyreni